Prime Suspects was an American rap group from the 3rd Ward of New Orleans, Louisiana. The group was composed of Glock, New-9 & Uzi, that was signed to Master P's No Limit Records. The group appeared on many of No Limit's releases including Master P's Ghetto D and Magic's Sky's the Limit, among others. They released their debut album in late 1998 entitled, Guilty Til Proven Innocent, but it failed to live up to the success of some of No Limit's other albums, peaking at only #36 on the Billboard 200. The group disbanded shortly after (New-9 was a part of TRU Records during 2000-2002).

Discography

Studio albums

Compilation albums

Singles

As lead artist

See also
 No Limit Records
 No Limit Records discography
 Beats by the Pound

References

American hip hop groups
Southern hip hop groups
No Limit Records artists
African-American musical groups
Musical groups established in 1997
Musical groups disestablished in 1999
American musical trios
Gangsta rap groups